THD may refer to:
 Total harmonic distortion, a measure of the distortion of an audio signal
 Total Hi Def (Total HD), an optical disc format
 Th.D. or D.Th. or D.Theol., a Doctor of Theology degree
 Thames Ditton railway station, Surrey, National Rail station code
 THD Electronics, a guitar amplifier manufacturer
 Transanal hemorrhoidal dearterialization, a surgical procedure
 That Handsome Devil, an American alternative rock band
 The IATA airport code for Thọ Xuân Airport
 The ICAO airline code for Thai Smile
 Transmitting Heading Device